A Midnight Romance is a 1919 American silent romantic drama film directed by Lois Weber and starring Anita Stewart. It was produced by Stewart and Louis B. Mayer. It was only feature film between First National and Metro Pictures' producer Louis Mayer.

Plot

Cast
Anita Stewart as Marie
Jack Holt as Roger Sloan
Edwin B. Tilton as Roger's Father
Elinor Hancock as Roger's Mother
Helen Yoder as Roger's Sister
Juanita Hansen as Blondie Maze
Montague Dumond as Blinkey Deal

Preservation status
The film is preserved incomplete in the Library of Congress collection.

References

External links

1919 romantic drama films
1919 films
American silent feature films
American romantic drama films
Films directed by Lois Weber
American black-and-white films
First National Pictures films
1910s American films
Silent romantic drama films
Silent American drama films